Gallops Island, also known as Gallups Island, is an island in the Boston Harbor Islands National Recreation Area. The island has a rocky beach and offers long vistas from the top of its grassy bluffs. Gallops Island is closed until asbestos remediation is completed.

The island is named after John Gallop, one of Boston Harbor's first pilots, who lived on the island. Since then the island has been occupied by a restaurant and inn and a quarantine station. During the Civil War the island was occupied by a military camp housing 3,000 Union soldiers, and during World War II it was occupied by a radio school and a school for bakers and cooks.  During World War I, Gallops Island was used as an infirmary for thousands of American soldiers who contracted "Spanish influenza" and pneumonia.  Many died every day, to be replaced by new arrivals.

The island contains a collection of ornamental trees, shrubs and herbaceous plants that date back to its earlier uses, with additional trees being planted by the Civilian Conservation Corps in the 1930s. Photographs from the 1940s show that a tree lined street extended the length of the island. Although the buildings have been demolished, the pathways and foundations still exist and are lined with privet hedges and surrounded by fruit, shade and coniferous trees, including lilacs, mock-orange, snowberry, and forsythia. Also present are self-sown sumac, poplar, poison ivy, and bayberry. The vegetation has been badly damaged in recent years by the island's population of rabbits.

Gallops Island was closed in 2000 due to the presence of asbestos-containing building debris from former military uses. The Massachusetts Department of Conservation and Recreation has determined that the island will be closed to the public until visitors can be welcomed back safely. As of August 2010, it was predicting a re-opening no earlier than 2015, presuming remediation funding could be obtained.

References

Boston Harbor islands
Civilian Conservation Corps in Massachusetts
Islands of Suffolk County, Massachusetts